Justin Paul Clancy is an Australian politician. He has been a member of the New South Wales Legislative Assembly since 2019, representing Albury for the Liberal Party.

Clancy was a veterinarian before entering politics.

Political career

In November 2018, Clancy was unanimously endorsed by the Liberal Party to contest the 2019 state election, following the retirement of Greg Aplin.

Clancy won the seat of Albury with a 56.8% first preference vote.

References

 

Year of birth missing (living people)
Living people
Liberal Party of Australia members of the Parliament of New South Wales
Members of the New South Wales Legislative Assembly
21st-century Australian politicians